Aerolíneas Mas was an airline with its corporate headquarters in the Ciudad Universitaria (University City) in Santo Domingo, Dominican Republic. It offered flights to several domestic destinations. Its flight operations were based at La Isabela International Airport in Santo Domingo.

History 
Aerolíneas Mas was founded in 2005 as a charter airline. Then it became a regular airline with all flights to the Caribbean.

Fleet 
Three aircraft conformed the airline's fleet.

Destinations 

Regular:

Punta Cana - Punta Cana International Airport
Santiago - Cibao International Airport
Santo Domingo - La Isabela International Airport

Haiti - Toussaint Louverture International Airport

Aruba - Queen Beatrix International Airport

Charter:

Barahona - María Montez International Airport
La Romana - La Romana International Airport
Monte Cristi - Osvaldo Virgil Airport
Pedernales - Cabo Rojo Airport
Samaná - Arroyo Barril International Airport

Willemstad - Hato International Airport

Philipsburg - Princess Julianna International Airport

Port of Spain - Piarco International Airport

References

External links

 Aerolíneas Mas official website 

Defunct airlines of the Dominican Republic
Airlines established in 2005
Airlines disestablished in 2015